The lunar maria (singular: mare ) are large, dark, basaltic plains on Earth's Moon, formed by ancient asteroid impacts on the far side on the Moon that triggered volcanic activity on the opposite (near) side. They were dubbed , Latin for 'seas', by early astronomers who mistook them for actual seas. They are less reflective than the "highlands" as a result of their iron-rich composition, and hence appear dark to the naked eye. The maria cover about 16% of the lunar surface, mostly on the side visible from Earth. The few maria on the far side are much smaller, residing mostly in very large craters. The last three are smaller than maria, but have the same nature and characteristics.

The names of maria refer to sea features (Mare Humorum, Mare Imbrium, Mare Insularum, Mare Nubium, Mare Spumans, Mare Undarum, Mare Vaporum, Oceanus Procellarum, Mare Frigoris), sea attributes (Mare Australe, Mare Orientale, Mare Cognitum, Mare Marginis), or states of mind (Mare Crisium, Mare Ingenii, Mare Serenitatis, Mare Tranquillitatis). Mare Humboldtianum and Mare Smythii were established before the final nomenclature, that of states of mind, was accepted, and do not follow this pattern. When Mare Moscoviense was discovered by the Luna 3, and the name was proposed by the Soviet Union, it was only accepted by the International Astronomical Union with the justification that Moscow is a state of mind.

Ages
The ages of the mare basalts have been determined both by direct radiometric dating and by the technique of crater counting. The radiometric ages range from about 3.16 to 4.2 billion years old (Ga), whereas the youngest ages determined from crater counting are about 1.2 Ga. Nevertheless, the majority of mare basalts appear to have erupted between about 3 and 3.5 Ga. The few basaltic eruptions that occurred on the far side are old, whereas the youngest flows are found within Oceanus Procellarum on the nearside. While many of the basalts either erupted within, or flowed into, low-lying impact basins, the largest expanse of volcanic units, Oceanus Procellarum, does not correspond to any known impact basin.

Distribution of basalts

There are many common misconceptions concerning the spatial distribution of mare basalts. 
Since many mare basalts fill low-lying impact basins, it was once assumed that the impact event itself somehow caused the volcanic eruption. Note: current data in fact may not preclude this, although the timing and length of mare volcanism in a number of basins cast some doubt on it. Initial mare volcanism generally seems to have begun within 100 million years of basin formation. Although these authors felt that 100 million years was sufficiently long that a correlation between impact and volcanism seemed unlikely, there are problems with this argument.  The authors also point out that the oldest and deepest basalts in each basin are likely buried and inaccessible, leading to a sampling bias.
It is sometimes suggested that the gravity field of the Earth might preferentially allow eruptions to occur on the near side, but not on the far side. However, in a reference frame rotating with the Moon, the centrifugal acceleration the Moon is experiencing is exactly equal and opposite to the gravitational acceleration of the Earth. There is thus no net force directed towards the Earth. The Earth tides do act to deform the shape of the Moon, but this shape is that of an elongated ellipsoid with high points at both the sub- and anti-Earth points. As an analogy, there are two high tides per day on Earth, and not one.
Since mare basaltic magmas are denser than upper crustal anorthositic materials, basaltic eruptions might be favored at locations of low elevation where the crust is thin. However, the far side South Pole–Aitken basin contains the lowest elevations of the Moon and yet is only sparingly filled by basaltic lavas. In addition, the crustal thickness beneath this basin is predicted to be much smaller than beneath Oceanus Procellarum. While the thickness of the crust might modulate the quantity of basaltic lavas that ultimately reach the surface, crustal thickness by itself cannot be the sole factor controlling the distribution of mare basalts.
It is commonly suggested that there is some form of link between the synchronous rotation of the Moon about the Earth, and the mare basalts. However, gravitational torques that result in tidal despinning only arise from the moments of inertia of the body (these are directly relatable to the spherical harmonic degree-2 terms of the gravity field), and the mare basalts hardly contribute to this (see also tidal locking). (Hemispheric structures correspond to spherical harmonic degree 1, and do not contribute to the moments of inertia.) Furthermore, tidal despinning is predicted to have occurred quickly (in the order of thousands of years), whereas the majority of mare basalts erupted about one billion years later.

The reason that the mare basalts are predominantly located on the near-side hemisphere of the Moon is still being debated by the scientific community. Based on data obtained from the Lunar Prospector mission, it appears that a large proportion of the Moon's inventory of heat producing elements (in the form of KREEP) is located within the regions of Oceanus Procellarum and the Imbrium basin, a unique geochemical province now referred to as the Procellarum KREEP Terrane. While the enhancement in heat production within the Procellarum KREEP Terrane is most certainly related to the longevity and intensity of volcanism found there, the mechanism by which KREEP became concentrated within this region is not agreed upon.

Chemical composition 
Using terrestrial classification schemes, all mare basalts are classified as tholeiitic, but specific subclassifications have been invented to further describe the population of lunar basalts. Mare basalts are generally grouped into three series based on their major element chemistry: high-Ti basalts, low-Ti basalts, and very-low-Ti (VLT) basalts. While these groups were once thought to be distinct based on the Apollo samples, global remote sensing data from the Clementine mission now shows that there is a continuum of titanium concentrations between these end members, and that the high-titanium concentrations are the least abundant. TiO2 abundances can reach up to 15 wt.% for mare basalts, whereas most terrestrial basalts have abundances much less than 4 wt.%. A special group of lunar basalts is the KREEP basalts, which are abnormally rich in potassium (K), rare-earth elements (REE), and phosphorus (P). A major difference between terrestrial and lunar basalts is the near-total absence of water in any form in the lunar basalts. Lunar basalts do not contain hydrogen-bearing minerals like the amphiboles and phyllosilicates that are common in terrestrial basalts due to alteration or metamorphism.

See also

References

Further reading
 Paul D. Spudis, The Once and Future Moon, Smithsonian Institution Press, 1996, .

External links 

Google Moon
Lunar and Planetary Institute: Exploring the Moon
Lunar and Planetary Institute: Lunar Atlases
Ralph Aeschliman Planetary Cartography and Graphics: Lunar Maps 
Moon articles in Planetary Science Research Discoveries
Cryptomare formations

 
Mare